Daniela Garcia (born May 20, 1979) is a former Republican member of the Michigan House of Representatives.

Garcia is a native of Holland, Michigan. Her father, Frank Garcia, was for a time superintendent of Holland Public Schools, and her mother, Yolanda Lopez Garcia, worked as a teacher in Holland Public Schools.

Education 
Garcia earned a bachelor's degree from University of Michigan. Garcia earned a master's degree in education policy and administration from Catholic University.

Career 
Garcia started her career as a policy advisor to Peter Hoekstra, a congressman. Garcia worked on the development of health care policy and educational policy.

On November 4, 2014, Garcia won the election and became a Republican member of Michigan House of Representatives for District 90. Garcia defeated James Haspas with 78.31% of the votes. On November 8, 2016, as an incumbent, Garcia won the election and continued serving District 90. Garcia defeated Mary M. Yedinak with 72.86% of the votes.

At the start of 2015 the Detroiter Magazine named her one of six Michigan legislators to watch.

In the August 2018 Michigan primary election, Garcia did not seek for another term in Michigan House of Representatives. Garcia seek for a seat in the Michigan state senate for district 30 unsuccessfully. Garcia had 26.27% of the votes and she was defeated by Roger Victory, Joe Haveman, and Rett DeBoer.

In January 2019, Garcia was appointed as the Director of Outreach in the United States Department of Education's Office of Communications and Outreach.

See also 
 2014 Michigan House of Representatives election
 2016 Michigan House of Representatives election

References

External links 
VoteDanielaGarcia.com
 Daniela Garcia at ballotpedia.org
Detroiter Magazine legislators to watch
MLive article on Garcia winning the primary
Holland Sentinel article on Garcia
hollandsentinel.com
2019 detroitnes.com

1980 births
Living people
University of Michigan alumni
People from Holland, Michigan
Republican Party members of the Michigan House of Representatives
Women state legislators in Michigan
21st-century American politicians
21st-century American women politicians
American politicians of Mexican descent